Fortescue is a village in Holt County, Missouri, United States. The population was 21 at the 2020 census.

History
Fortescue was founded circa 1884. An early railroad promoter named Fortesque gave the community the maiden name of his mother.  A post office called Fortescue was established in 1884, and remained in operation until 1973.

Geography
Fortescue is located at  (40.051970, -95.317731).

Demographics

2010 census
As of the census of 2010, there were 32 people, 10 households, and 9 families living in the village. The racial makeup of the village was 100.0% White.

There were 10 households, of which 40.0% had children under the age of 18 living with them, 80.0% were married couples living together, 10.0% had a male householder with no wife present, and 10.0% were non-families. 0.0% of all households were made up of individuals. The average household size was 3.20 and the average family size was 3.33.

The median age in the village was 31 years. 34.4% of residents were under the age of 18; 6.3% were between the ages of 18 and 24; 28.2% were from 25 to 44; 28.2% were from 45 to 64; and 3.1% were 65 years of age or older. The gender makeup of the village was 43.8% male and 56.3% female.

2000 census
As of the census of 2000, there were 51 people, 18 households, and 10 families living in the town. The population density was 674.1 people per square mile (246.1/km2). There were 23 housing units at an average density of 304.0 per square mile (111.0/km2). The racial makeup of the town was 100.00% White.

There were 18 households, out of which 61.1% had children under the age of 18 living with them, 44.4% were married couples living together, and 38.9% were non-families. 38.9% of all households were made up of individuals, and 11.1% had someone living alone who was 65 years of age or older. The average household size was 2.83 and the average family size was 3.82.

In the town the population was spread out, with 41.2% under the age of 18, 7.8% from 18 to 24, 35.3% from 25 to 44, 11.8% from 45 to 64, and 3.9% who were 65 years of age or older. The median age was 26 years. For every 100 females, there were 131.8 males. For every 100 females age 18 and over, there were 172.7 males.

The median income for a household in the town was $26,250, and the median income for a family was $28,125. Males had a median income of $33,125 versus $11,250 for females. The per capita income for the town was $5,695. There were 38.5% of families and 29.5% of the population living below the poverty line, including 21.4% of under eighteens and none of those over 64.

References

Villages in Holt County, Missouri
Villages in Missouri